Christoffer Tobias Andersson (born 22 October 1978) is a Swedish former professional football player who played as a defender and midfielder. Andersson is best remembered for his time with Helsingborgs IF for which he played more than 500 official games. He also represented Lillestrøm SK, Hannover 96, and Halmstads BK during a career that spanned between 1998 and 2016. A full international between 2000 and 2006, he won 24 caps for the Sweden national team.

Club career

Helsingborgs IF 
Andersson started off his career with Nybro IF before signing for Helsingborgs IF in 1996. During his first season with the club he helped the team win the 1997–98 Svenska Cupen. The following year, he was part of the Helsingborg team that won the 1999 Allsvenskan. In 2000, he played a vital part in Helsingborg qualifying for the 2000–01 UEFA Champions League, by scoring a goal in a second round aggregate win against BATE Borisov, and then playing in all 180 minutes as Helsingborg eliminated the Serie A club Inter Milan in the third round. In the group stage, Andersson played in five games as Helsingborg finished last in Group F behind Bayern Munich, Paris Saint-Germain, and Rosenborg. In 2001, Andersson was selected as Årets HIF:are (Helsingborg player of the year).

Lillestrøm SK 
In January 2004, Andersson left Helsingborgs IF on a free transfer and signed a three-year contract with the Norwegian outfit Lillestrøm SK.

Hannover 96 
After 2.5 years in Norway, Andersson signed with the German Bundesliga team Hannover 96. However, Andersson struggled to receive playing time in Germany and only represented the club in 7 league games.

Return to Helsingborgs IF 
In the summer of 2007, Andersson returned to Helsingborgs IF after three years abroad. Andersson had an immediate impact on the team and was an instrumental part of the Helsingborg team that reached the Round of 32 of the 2007–08 UEFA Cup after finishing second in Group H behind Bordeaux but ahead of Galatasaray, Panionios, and Austria Wien, and eliminating Hereenveen in the qualifying stage. Andersson scored the winning goal in the 2–3 away victory against Galatasaray. In 2008, Andersson was yet again named Årets HIF:are.

Andersson won multiple silverware with Helsingborg during his second stint, winning the 2010 and 2011 Svenska Cupen titles, the 2011 Allsvenskan title, as well as the 2011 and 2012 Svenska Supercupen titles.

Halmstads BK 
Ahead of the 2015 Allsvenskan season, Andersson signed for Halmstads BK.

Second return to Helsingborgs IF and retirement 
For the 2016 Allsvenskan season, Andersson yet again returned to Helsingborgs IF. Andersson retired at the end of the season after having a played a total of 350 Allsvenskan games, which is a club record, as well as more than 500 official games for the club.

International career 
Andersson represented the Sweden U19 and U21 teams before making his full international debut for Sweden on 31 January 2000 in a friendly 1–0 win against Denmark, coming on as a substitute for Roland Nilsson in the 74th minute.

He played in the qualifying campaigns for the 2002 FIFA World Cup, UEFA Euro 2004, and the 2006 FIFA World Cup, but did not make the final squad for Sweden in any of the tournaments.

He won his 24th and last international cap in a friendly game against Ireland on 1 Match 2006.

Coaching career 
In 2016, Andersson coached the U17 team of Helsingborgs IF. In November 2016, Andersson was appointed assistant manager of the first team of the club under manager Per-Ola Ljung. After 2,5 years as assistant manager, the club announced on 18 June 2019, that he had left the club following the appointment of new manager Henrik Larsson.

Career statistics

International 
Appearances and goals by national team and year

Honours 
Helsingborgs IF
 Allsvenskan: 1999, 2011
 Svenska Cupen: 1997–98, 2010, 2011
 Svenska Supercupen: 2011, 2012
Individual
 Årets HIF:are : 2001, 2008

References

External links
 

Living people
1978 births
People from Nybro Municipality
Association football defenders
Association football midfielders
Swedish footballers
Sweden international footballers
Sweden under-21 international footballers
Helsingborgs IF players
Hannover 96 players
Lillestrøm SK players
Halmstads BK players
Expatriate footballers in Germany
Expatriate footballers in Norway
Swedish expatriate sportspeople in Norway
Swedish expatriate footballers
Swedish expatriate sportspeople in Germany
Bundesliga players
Allsvenskan players
Eliteserien players
Sportspeople from Kalmar County